Qeshlaq-e Galam Ali Hajj Savad (also Romanized as Qeshlāq-e Galam ʿAlī Ḩājj Savād) is a village in Qeshlaq-e Sharqi Rural District, Qeshlaq Dasht District, Bileh Savar County, Ardabil Province, Iran. At the 2006 census, its population was 29, in 8 families.

References 

Towns and villages in Bileh Savar County